Universal Soldier is the sixth solo studio album by American rapper Pastor Troy. It was released in 2002 through Universal Records. Recording sessions took place at Madd House Studios, at the Village Recorder. at PatchWerk Recording Studios, at Sound Lab, at Audio Vision Studios, at Flamingo Studios, at Off The Top Studios, and at 1210 Studios. Production was handled by Lil' Jon, Timbaland, Tony "T-Cap" Sims, Jazze Pha, Benny "DaDa" Tillman, Big Floaty, Carlos "Los Vagez" Thornton, Church Boi, Carl Mo, and Pastor Troy himself, with Dino Delvaille serving as executive producer. It features guest appearances from Bun B, Ms. Jade, Pastor Troy Sr., Timbaland, and fellow D.S.G.B. members. The album peaked at number 13 on the Billboard 200 and number 2 on the Top R&B/Hip-Hop Albums in the United States. Its lead single, "Are We Cuttin'", reached number 96 on the US Billboard Hot 100 and was used on the soundtrack to Rob Cohen's film xXx.

Track listing

Personnel
Micah Troy – main artist, producer (tracks: 1, 2, 15, 16)
Chevon Young – featured artist (track 3)
Bernard Freeman – featured artist (track 4)
Timothy Mosley – featured artist (track 6), producer (tracks: 3, 6)
Lil Pete – featured artist (tracks: 9, 17)
Black Out – featured artist (track 11)
Pin Head – featured artist (track 11)
Pastor Troy Sr. – featured artist (track 14)
Tony "T-Cap" Sims – producer (tracks: 4, 14)
Jonathan Smith – producer (tracks: 5, 7, 13)
Benny "DaDa" Tillman – producer (track 8)
Carlos "Los Vagez" Thornton – producer (track 8)
Phalon Alexander – producer (tracks: 9, 11)
Kevin "Big Floaty" Burton – producer (track 10)
Church Boi – producer (track 12)
Carlton Mahone, Jr. – producer (track 17)
Dino Delvaille – executive producer, A&R direction
Sandy Brummels – art direction
Jonathan Mannion – photography
Nino Montana – coordinator
Adrienne Muhammad – A&R coordinator

Charts

Weekly charts

Year-end charts

References

External links

2002 albums
Pastor Troy albums
Universal Records albums
Albums produced by Lil Jon
Albums produced by Jazze Pha
Albums produced by Timbaland